Michael J. Rosen (born September 20, 1954), is an American writer, ranging from children's picture books to adult poetry and to novels, and editor of anthologies ranging almost as broadly. He has acted as editor for Mirth of a Nation and 101 Damnations: The Humorists' Tour of Personal Hells, and his poetry has been featured in The Best American Poetry 1995.

Early life

Rosen was born in Columbus, Ohio, the eldest of Marvin and Nona Rosen's three children. He spent his childhood exploring the wilderness around the former pasture in which his parents had built their house and taking drives through the country with his family. His childhood, and part of his adulthood, were also filled with summer camp, an institution which he attended as a camper from age four to thirteen and as a counselor from fourteen to twenty-six. Rosen was never the type to play well in team activities; he states that the more solitary activities at camp "spared me the uneasiness I felt when playing team sports like Little League or spending phys ed class time waiting to be chosen, wishing to be elsewhere. That dread of being singled out lingered through middle school. I never realized that almost everyone there harbored some reason to feel uncomfortable." Perhaps a contributing factor was the bullies who harassed him through his school years. His favorite place at school was the art room, where he spent all his free time during school hours; after school Rosen would continue with his artistic inclinations through drawing, collecting comics, and spending parts of his weekend at the advertising agency operated by his best friend's father. His parents, a loving couple, were very supportive in all his pursuits, as were several of his teachers and neighbors.

After he graduated from high school, Rosen chose to go to Kent State University for a year before transferring into the pre-med program at Ohio State University. He finished up as an animal behavior major in 1976 and attended St. George's University School of Medicine in Grenada for a short time before going on to work as an instructor for Ohio State University through 1985. During that time, he also attended Columbia University, earning his Masters in poetry in 1981.

Career

After getting his MFA in poetry, Rosen started work as a design consultant for the Jefferson Center for Learning and the Arts in 1982. In 1983, he became the literary director of the Thurber House in Columbus, Ohio. During his near-twenty-year stay as literary director, Rosen was the editor for several compilations of James Thurber's writings; he also was involved in the creation  of the Thurber Prize for American Humor. Rosen has also "taught in the Ohio Art Council Poetry-in-the-Schools Program and Greater Columbus Arts Council Artist-in-the-Schools Program, and has conducted over 500 young authors' conferences, in-service days, writing workshops, guest author days, and residencies (for elementary, middle school, and high school students and teachers)."

Notable works

Michael J. Rosen is a very prolific author who has been involved in the creation of over 150 books. He first began his career as an author in 1984 with the publication of a book of poetry called A Drink at the Mirage. Rosen has written on a wide variety of topics, ranging from children’s books on religion (Our Eight Nights of Hanukkah; The Blessing of the Animals) to books about dogs (With a Dog like That, a Kid like Me... ; The Company of Dogs: Twenty-one Stories by Contemporary Masters) to humorous fact books on various subjects (No Dribbling the Squid: Octopush, Skin Kicking, Elephant Polo and Other Oddball Sports; Balls!; The 60-Second Encyclopedia). Some of his most popular works include his most recent book Any Body's Guess!: Quirky Quizzes About What Makes You Tick, Mirth of a Nation: The Best Contemporary Humor, 101 Damnations: The Humorists' Tour of Personal Hells, The Cuckoo's Haiku, and Elijah's Angel: A Story for Chanukah and Christmas. Rosen says of his ideas on writing, "A story must be a real enough house so that you can walk around, get comfortable, grab something from the fridge, and then be surprised by the ideas that haunt the place."

Rosen has also acted as an illustrator for several works, among them The Blessing of the Animals, Food Fight: Poets Join the Fight Against Hunger with Poems to Favorite Foods, and a variety for Gourmet (magazine) and The New Yorker.

Mirth of a Nation: The Best Contemporary Humor

Mirth of a Nation: The Best Contemporary Humor, originally published in 2000, is an anthology of contemporary humor written by over fifty comedians, writers, and other funny fellows, and edited by Michael J. Rosen. Mirth of a Nation was reviewed positively by January Magazine, a review in which Jonathan Shipley said that “Michael Rosen, author and editor of many notable books for adults and children as well as the literary director of The Thurber House, has collected some funny writing. Seriously, it's good stuff.” When interviewed, Michael J. Rosen said that “Mirth... and More Mirth of a Nation make another claim: That humor writing is seriously funny. Now of course I mean "genuinely" funny, but I also mean also "seriously" as in "profound" — humorists are among the few dependable sources of honest (re)calibration and reality checking.” The volume was later published in 2002 as an audiobook, and in 2007 in hardcover format. Rosen also edited two additional humor anthologies in the same vein, More Mirth of a Nation (published November 2002), and May Contain Nuts (published September 2004).

The Cuckoo’s Haiku and Other Birding Poems

The Cuckoo’s Haiku and Other Birding Poems is a book of haikus on birds, written by Rosen and illustrated by Stan Fellows. It has been very well reviewed, given a starred review by Publishers Weekly and Kirkus Reviews, as well as being named a Best Book of 2009 by Kirkus Reviews. It was also nominated for the 2009 Cybils award for poetry and won the 2010 Ohioana Book Award for Juvenile Literature. Publishers Weekly’s review said of the book that “text and images, like a well-rehearsed duet, balance and echo each other’s beauty.”

Rosen was interviewed several times due to the success of The Cuckoo’s Haiku. When asked by Bill Eichenberger of The Columbus Dispatch about the similarities between birds and haiku, Rosen wrote that “Both are fleeting impressions. Rather than whole stories and studied observations, these two arts usually offer snatched glimpses and surprising hints... For me, looking at one specific thing, one species, helps to focus and clarify ideas or principles that apply more broadly.” In another interview, on the website The Miss Rumphius Effect, Rosen explained that he would “always cherish one of W. H. Auden’s definitions of poetry: clear thinking about mixed feelings,” and also, in an interview by Julie Danielson on Seven Impossible Things before Breakfast, that “Writing about wildlife is really writing about my own life”.

Balls!

Balls! is a humorous factbook about the history of "a host of spheroids (and one notable ellipse) that make the sporting world go round" (Bulletin of the Center for Children’s Books, qtd. in ). Balls! has been positively reviewed by the National Center for the Study of Children's Literature, the Midwest Book Review, and several other sources. It has also been named a Junior Library Guild Premier Selection.

Elijah's Angel: A Story for Chanukah and Christmas

Elijah's Angel: A Story for Chanukah and Christmas is a multiple award-winning tale about the friendship between a 9-year-old and an 80-year-old barber. The book's title character is based on Elijah Pierce, a barber nearby to whom both Rosen and the book's illustrator Aminah Robinson lived. Among other honors, the story has received the National Jewish Book Award for Children Picture Book in 1993, has been named an American Bookseller's Pick of the Lists, was designated by Parents' Magazine as the Best Book of 1992, and was the inspiration for a family opera by composer Robert Kapilow. Ari L. Goldman of The New York Times called the book "so finely done that the drawings and the story line compete for attention."

In 2013, Rosen was commissioned by the Jewish Community Center of Greater Columbus to create a full-length play based on this work. Its world premier will be staged at the Center's theater in December 2013.

Awards

Michael J. Rosen has received numerous awards from a variety of sources. Some of his most noteworthy include the National Jewish Book Award for Elijah's Angel: A Story for Chanukah and Christmas, the Simon Wiesenthal Museum of Tolerance Once Upon a World Book Award for A School for Pompey Walker, the Juvenile Literature Ohioana Library Award for The Heart Is Big Enough, and the Ohioana Library Career Citation in children's literature. He has accepted grants from the Jefferson Center for Learning and the Arts, the Ingram Merrill Foundation, the Ohio Arts Council and the National Endowment for the Arts. Additionally, he has been named a fellow to the Ohio Arts Council (in poetry) and the National Endowment for the Arts, and an Ingram Merrill fellow in poetry.

Personal life

Rosen is now living in Glenford, Ohio. He stays busy running around the country to literary conferences and classrooms trying to spread his love for literature, writing, and illustrating. His interests, around which his work sometimes centers, include dogs, cooking, and philanthropy. Because of his interest in and books about dogs, The Washington Post gave him the name of "fidosopher", a name he liked enough to appropriate it for his website.

Philanthropy

Michael J. Rosen was named by The New York Times as "an example of creative philanthropy". Rosen has served on the board of directors for Share Our Strength for over fourteen years; the profits from six of the books he has created benefit the organization, including two cookbooks with recipes from over one hundred and fifty of the United States’ most esteemed chefs. In 2005, his efforts were recognized by the organization with its first Lifetime Achievement Award. In an interview by ABCDBooks about Down to Earth, Rosen explained that learning about Share Our Strength was like seeing "a door where before I had perceived a wall. It takes all kinds of people with all sorts of talents to address any cause we might face."

Rosen also established his own granting program, The Company of Animals Fund, in 1990; the program "offered support to animal welfare agencies providing emergency or ongoing care to companion animals from the profits of seven books and two touring illustration exhibits." The fund was benefitted by "three anthologies of short stories, collections of commissioned personal essays and visual suites, children's books, and sidelines such as boxed cards and illustrated address books." Rosen has been quoted in an interview saying "It has been an enormous honor to precipitate such collections and a concomitant reward to know that these generated funds offer such lasting benefits. Rather than imagine this a unique design, I hope that such collective philanthropy becomes a perennial enterprise in publishing."

See also

References

External links
Official site

American humorists
American philanthropists
American male poets
American book editors
Writers from Columbus, Ohio
American children's writers
Living people
1954 births
Columbia University School of the Arts alumni
People from Perry County, Ohio
English-language haiku poets